Kozlevskaya is a rural locality (a village) in Gorodishchenskoye Rural Settlement, Nyuksensky District, Vologda Oblast, Russia. The population was 105 as of 2002.

Geography 
Kozlevskaya is located 40 km south of Nyuksenitsa (the district's administrative centre) by road. Pozharishche is the nearest rural locality.

References 

Rural localities in Nyuksensky District